Leslie Leopold McFarlane (19 August 1952 – 27 May 2019) was a Jamaican-born English cricketer. McFarlane was a right-handed batsman who bowled right-arm fast pace. He was born at Portland, Jamaica.

He is best remembered for the County Championship match between Lancashire and Warwickshire in 1982. In Warwickshire's first innings, he was hit for over 8 runs an over as Geoff Humpage and Alvin Kallicharran put on a stand of 470. In Warwickshire's second innings, he took a career best 6 for 59 as Lancashire went on to win by ten wickets.

References

External links
Les McFarlane at ESPNcricinfo
Les McFarlane at CricketArchive

1952 births
2019 deaths
People from Portland Parish
English people of Jamaican descent
English cricketers
Northamptonshire cricketers
Bedfordshire cricketers
Lancashire cricketers
Glamorgan cricketers
Staffordshire cricketers